The discography of The Civil Wars consists of two studio albums, four extended plays (EP), five live albums, eight singles, and six music videos. The material has been released by Sensibility Music, LLC.

The Civil Wars was a group composed of singer-songwriters Joy Williams and John Paul White. Their debut studio album, Barton Hollow, was produced by Charlie Peacock and was released on February 1, 2011. It peaked at number 10 on the US Billboard 200 chart in the United States and garnered the top spot of the US Independent Albums and US Top Folk Albums. It became the number 1 downloaded album on iTunes the same week of its released. It also reached the charts in Canada and the United Kingdom. The title track, "Barton Hollow", which was released in 2011, failed to chart on US Billboard Hot 100 but peaked at number 1 on the Bubbling Under Hot 100 Singles.

Barton Hollow album and the title track won the Best Folk Album and the Best Country Duo/Group Performance at the 54th Grammy Awards in 2012, respectively.

Albums

Studio albums

Live albums

Soundtrack albums

Extended plays

Singles

Other charting songs

Featured singles

Music videos

References

External links
 

Discographies of American artists
Folk music discographies